Ghoksadanga Birendranath Mahavidyalaya, established in 2011, is general degree college in Ghoksadanga. It is in Cooch Behar district. It offers undergraduate courses in arts. It is affiliated to  Cooch Behar Panchanan Barma University.

Departments

Arts
Bengali
English
History
Education
Political Science
Sanskrit

See also

References

External links 

Universities and colleges in Cooch Behar district
Colleges affiliated to Cooch Behar Panchanan Barma University
Academic institutions formerly affiliated with the University of North Bengal
Educational institutions established in 2011
2011 establishments in West Bengal